Governor Aiken may refer to:
 George Aiken (1892-1984), governor of Vermont (1937-1941)
 William Aiken Jr. (1806-1887), governor of South Carolina (1844-1846)